Zanthoxylum dimorphophyllumis a tree from the Rutaceae family.

Description
Zanthoxylum dimorphophyllum are deciduous trees that are typically 1-3 meters tall.

Classification
The species was recorded in Oxford's Annals of Botany in 1895. It would later be accepted in 2008's Flora of China.

References

stenophyllum
Taxa named by William Hemsley (botanist)
Flora of China
Plants described in 1895